Kai Michael James Corbett (born 8 October 2002) is a Spanish professional footballer who plays for Peterborough United, as a winger.

Career
Corbett was born in Barcelona, Spain to English parents, before moving to England as a child. Prior to moving to England, Corbett was in the youth academy at Barcelona. Corbett joined Arsenal at under-9 level, after playing for Chelsea and Southampton. Corbett later represented Reading before signing for West Ham United in 2014. In early 2020, Corbett had a trial at Manchester United, scoring in a 1–0 win against Blackburn Rovers' under-18's, however Corbett did not gain a contract at Manchester United due to a dispute in his compensation fee.

On 15 November 2021, Corbett signed for EFL Championship club Peterborough United. On 27 November 2021, Corbett made his debut for Peterborough, starting in a 0–0 draw against Barnsley.

Career statistics

References

2002 births
Living people
Footballers from Barcelona
Association football wingers
Spanish footballers
English footballers
Spanish people of English descent
Peterborough United F.C. players
English Football League players